Carsten Ball was the defending champion but lost in the second round to Blake Strode.

2nd seed Wayne Odesnik won the title, defeating 1st seed James Ward in the final, 7–5, 6–4.

Seeds

Draw

Finals

Top half

Bottom half

References
 Main Draw
 Qualifying Draw

Fifth Third Bank Tennis Championships - Singles
2011 MS